Abrahams Farmhouse is a historic home located at Duanesburg in Schenectady County, New York. It was built about 1839 and is a -story, rectangular frame building with a gable roof in a vernacular Greek Revival style.  It features a wide frieze pierced by eyebrow windows.

The property was covered in a 1984 study of Duanesburg historical resources. It was listed on the National Register of Historic Places in 1984.

References

Houses on the National Register of Historic Places in New York (state)
Houses in Schenectady County, New York
Greek Revival houses in New York (state)
Houses completed in 1839
National Register of Historic Places in Schenectady County, New York